Doreen (DAWR-een), also occasionally spelt Dorean or Dorine, is a feminine given name, usually found in English-speaking countries. It is a combination of Dora with the suffix -een, which is related to the -ín suffix used in Irish, usually signifying small size or as an endearment.

Dora is a variant of Dorothy / Dorothea, which derives from the Late Greek name Δωρόθεος (Dorotheos), which meant "gift of god" (from δῶρον/doron meaning "gift" and θεός/theos meaning "god". It is thus related to many other feminine given names names, including Dorian, Dorinda, Theodora and Isidora. Theodore is the masculine equivalent. Diminutive forms include Dee, Dodie, Dolly, Dory, Dot, Dottie, and Dotty.

The first known use of Doreen may have been in Edna Lyall's 1894 novel Doreen: The Story of a Singer.

Doreen may refer to the following people:

In arts, entertainment, and media
Doreen Blumhardt (1914–2009), New Zealand potter, ceramicist and arts educator
Doreen Carwithen (1922–2003), British composer
Doreen Chanter, British singer
Doreen Cronin (born 1966), American children's author
Doreen Garner (born 1986), American sculptor and performance artist
Doreen Gentzler (born 1957), American TV news anchor
Doreen Hawkins (1919–2013), British actress
Doreen Ketchens (born 1966), American jazz clarinetist
Doreen Mantle (born 1926), South African-born English actress
Doreen Sloane (1934–1990), English television actress
Doreen Taylor, American contemporary singer-songwriter and actress
Doreen Tracey (1943–2018), performer on the original Mickey Mouse Club television show
Doreen Valiente (1922–1999), English Wiccan author and poet

In government and politics
Doreen Chen, Jamaican politician
Doreen Dodick (born 1932), Canadian politician
Doreen Eagles, Canadian politician
Doreen Hamilton (born 1951), Canadian politician
Doreen Wonda Johnson, American politician who served as a member of the New Mexico House of Representatives
Doreen Knatchbull, Baroness Brabourne (1896–1979), Anglo-Irish aristocrat, socialite and victim of the Provisional IRA
Doreen Lawrence (born 1952), British politician
Doreen Massey, Baroness Massey of Darwen (born 1938), Labour member of the British House of Lords
Doreen Sioka (born 1960), Namibian politician
Doreen Wicks (1935–1904), Canadian nurse, humanitarian and Citizenship Judge
Doreen Young Wickremasinghe (1907–2000), British leftist, Communist politician and Member of Parliament in Sri Lanka

In sport
Doreen Amata (born 1988), Nigerian athlete
Doreen Wilber (1930–2008), American archer
Doreen Nabwire (born 1987), Kenyan former footballer

In other fields
Doreen Kartinyeri (1935–2007), Australian historian
Doreen Kimura (1933–2013), Canadian psychologist and educator
Doreen Knatchbull, Baroness Brabourne (1896–1979), Anglo-Irish aristocrat and murder victim of the Provisional IRA
Doreen Massey (geographer) (1944–2016), British social scientist and geographer
Doreen Warriner (1904–1972), British economist who saved Czech refugees in World War II
Doreen Wicks (1935–1904), Canadian nurse, humanitarian and Citizenship Judge

Fictional characters
Doreen, in Edna Lyall's 1894 novel Doreen: The Story of a Singer
Doreen, the female protagonist in The Songs of a Sentimental Bloke (1915) and its sequels, by C.J. Dennis
Doreen, the sister of Masa and Mune in the video game series Chrono Trigger
Doreen Anderson, prisoner on the Australian drama series Wentworth
Doreen Corkhill, on the British soap opera Brookside
Doreen Fenwick, on the British soap opera Coronation Street
Doreen Green, known as Squirrel Girl, in comic books published by Marvel Comics
Doreen Lostock, on the British soap opera Coronation Street

References

Given names
English given names
English feminine given names
Theophoric names